The Sand Hills are a mountain range in Washoe County, Nevada. The highest peak is Granite Peak; bounded on the west by Petersen mountain, the Porcupine Mountains and Lees Flat, on the south by Freds Mountain and on the east by Bedell Flat.

References 

Mountain ranges of Nevada
Mountain ranges of the Great Basin
Mountain ranges of Washoe County, Nevada